The Badr Organization ( Munaẓẓama Badr), previously known as the Badr Brigades or Badr Corps, is an Iraqi Shia Islamist political party and military organization headed by Hadi Al-Amiri. The Badr Brigade was the Iran-officered military wing of the Iran-based Shia Islamic party, Supreme Council for Islamic Revolution in Iraq (SCIRI), formed in 1982. The Badr Brigade was created by Iranian intelligence and Shia cleric Mohammad Baqir al-Hakim with the aim of fighting Saddam Hussein's regime during the Iran–Iraq War. Since the 2003 US-led invasion of Iraq most of Badr's fighters have entered the new Iraqi army and police force. Politically, Badr Brigade and SCIRI were considered to be one party since 2003, but have now unofficially separated with the Badr Organization now an official Iraqi political party. Badr Brigade forces, and their Iranian commanders, have come to prominence in 2014 fighting the Islamic State of Iraq and the Levant (ISIL) in Iraq. It is a part of the Popular Mobilization Forces.

History

SCIRI
The organization was formed in Iran in 1982 as the military wing of the Supreme Council for Islamic Revolution in Iraq. It was based in Iran for two decades during the rule of Saddam Hussein and led by Iranian officers. It consisted of several thousand Iraqi exiles, refugees, and defectors who fought alongside Iranian troops in the Iran–Iraq War. The group was armed and directed by Iran.

They briefly returned to Iraq in 1991 during the 1991 Iraqi uprising to fight against Saddam Hussein, focusing on the Shia holy cities of Najaf and Karbala. They retreated back into Iran after the uprising was crushed.

In 1995, during the Kurdish Civil War, Iran deployed 5,000 Badr fighters to Iraqi Kurdistan.

Post-invasion Iraq

Returning to Iraq following the 2003 US-led invasion, the group changed its name from brigade to organization in response to the attempted voluntary disarming of Iraqi militias by the Coalition Provisional Authority. It is however widely believed the organization is still active as a militia within the security forces and it has been accused of running a secret prison and sectarian killings during the Iraqi Civil War.

Because of their opposition to Saddam Hussein, the Badr Brigade was seen as a U.S. asset in the fight against Baathist partisans. After the fall of Baghdad, Badr forces reportedly joined the newly reconstituted army, police, and Interior Ministry in significant numbers. The Interior Ministry was controlled by SCIRI, and many Badr members became part of the Interior Ministry run Wolf Brigade. The Iraqi Interior Minister, Bayan Jabr, was a former leader of Badr Brigade militia.

In 2006 the United Nations human rights chief in Iraq, John Pace, said that hundreds of Iraqis were being tortured to death or executed by the Interior Ministry under SCIRI's control. According to a 2006 report by the Independent newspaper:
"Mr Pace said the Ministry of the Interior was 'acting as a rogue element within the government'. It was controlled by the main Shia party, the Supreme Council for Islamic Revolution in Iraq (Sciri); the Interior Minister, Baqir Jabr al-Zubeidi, is a former leader of SCIRI's Badr Brigade militia, which was one of the main groups accused of carrying out sectarian killings. Another was the Mahdi Army of the young cleric Muqtada al-Sadr, who is now part of the Shia coalition seeking to form a government after winning the mid-December election.

Many of the 110,000 policemen and police commandos under the ministry's control are suspected of being former members of the Badr Brigade. Not only counterinsurgency units such as the Wolf Brigade, the Scorpions, and the Tigers, but the commandos and even the highway patrol police were accused of acting as death squads during this period over a decade ago.

The paramilitary commandos, dressed in garish camouflage uniforms and driving around in pick-up trucks, were dreaded in Sunni neighbourhoods. People arrested by them during this period were frequently found dead several days later with their bodies bearing obvious marks of torture."

Military action against ISIL

Following ISIL's successful Anbar campaign and June 2014 offensive, the Badr Organization mobilized and won a series of battles against ISIL, including the Liberation of Jurf Al Sakhr and the Lifting of the Siege of Amirli. In early February 2015 the group, operating from its base at Camp Ashraf, fought in Diyala Governorate against ISIL. Over 100 militia were killed in the fighting, including 25 in Al Mansouryah. Badr's leader, Hadi Al-Amiri, said his militiamen were committed to the safety of Sunnis, but deep mutual suspicions remained in the light of recent sectarian killings and the suspicion that some Sunni tribes were allied with IS.

Structure
The Badr Corps consists of infantry, armor, artillery, anti-aircraft, and commando units with an estimated strength of between 10,000 and 50,000 men (according to the Badr Organization).
Quwat al-Shahid Muhammed Baqir al-Sadr
Liwa al-Imam Muhammad al-Jawad
Liwa Karbala
Tashkil al-Karar
The Turkmen Brigade Northern Front
Quwat al-Shaheed al-Qa'id Abu Muntadhar al-Muhammadawi
Tashkil Malik al-Ashtar
Fayli Kurd Brigade – 16 June 2014
Led by Secretary-General of Supreme National Front for Feyli Kurds, Maher al-Feyli
Size: 1,000–5,000
Helped by: Saad al-Madlabi (from State of Law Coalition) and Mouin AlKazmi

Scientific evaluation
The German Institute for International and Security Affairs (SWP) recognized a rise in the Shiite Badr organization since 2014 under the leadership of its Secretary General Hadi al-Amiri. In 2017 SWP wrote Badr organization is one of "the most important actors in Iraqi politics". It has become the most important instrument of Iranian politics in Iraq. Its aim is "to exert the greatest possible influence on the central government in Baghdad and at the same time to build the strongest possible Shiite militias that are dependent on Iran". The foundation compared the role of the organization with that of Hezbollah in Lebanon.

See also

 Private militias in Iraq
 List of armed groups in the Iraqi Civil War
 List of armed groups in the Syrian Civil War
 Holy Shrine Defender

References

External links
 Michele Norris & Ivan Watson, "Profile: Opposition Group Claiming to Represent Iraqi Shias Enters Northern Iraq," All Things Considered (March 10, 2003), NPR.
 Counter Extremism Project profile

 
Popular Mobilization Forces
Arab militant groups
Conservative parties in Iraq
Factions in the Iraq War
Military wings of political parties
Paramilitary forces of Iraq
Rebel groups in Iraq
Shia Islamic political parties
Anti-ISIL factions in Iraq
Anti-ISIL factions in Syria
Pro-government factions of the Syrian civil war
Organizations designated as terrorist by the United Arab Emirates
Shia Islamist groups
Organizations based in Asia designated as terrorist
Paramilitary organizations based in Iraq
Jihadist groups in Iraq